A Univox Coily is a hollow body electric guitar manufactured by Matsumoku and sold under the Univox brand.  It is nearly identical to the Epiphone EA-250 guitar also made by Matsumoku.  The guitar featured two pickups, a floating roller bridge, and a Bigsby-style tailpiece.

References 

Coily
Semi-acoustic guitars